Aura Elena Farfán is a Guatemalan human rights activist. She is one of the founders and Executive Director of FAMDEGUA (Familiares de Detenidos y Desaparecidos de Guatemala), a Guatemala City-based organization dedicated to surviving family members of people who have been disappeared by the Guatemalan government. It is one of Guatemala's oldest human rights organizations. Farfán has been the subject of frequent death threats as the result of her activities, and was, along with her driver, briefly kidnapped by armed assailants on 4 May 2001.

Aura received the International Women of Courage Award in 2018.

References 

Living people
Guatemalan human rights activists
Women human rights activists
Courage awards
Year of birth missing (living people)
Recipients of the International Women of Courage Award